Vincent Alan Pichel (born November 23, 1982) is an American professional mixed martial artist currently competing in the Lightweight division of the Ultimate Fighting Championship. A professional competitor since 2009, Pichel was also a contestant on The Ultimate Fighter: Live.

Early life
Growing up in Canoga Park, Los Angeles, Pichel was expelled from multiple schools due to his behavior during his youth. He never graduated, and at the age of 15 he was already using drugs which ultimately led him to get kicked out from his home by his mother. For five years he was using drugs and lacking permanent residence but after getting introduced to MMA by his friend, Pichel straightened out and started ambitious training.

Mixed martial arts career

Early career
Pichel compiled an amateur record of 10–1 before turning professional in 2009. He won his first seven fights by KO/TKO before trying out for The Ultimate Fighter: Live.

The Ultimate Fighter: Live
Pichel was one of 32 Lightweight fighters announced by the UFC to participate in first live season of The Ultimate Fighter reality show. Pichel advanced into the TUF house and won two bouts before losing to Al Iaquinta.

Ultimate Fighting Championship
After reaching the semifinals in The Ultimate Fighter: Live, Pichel was given an opportunity in the UFC. He made his official UFC debut on December 15, 2012. Pichel fought promotional newcomer Rustam Khabilov and lost the fight via KO due to a suplex and punches in the first round.

Pichel next fought Garett Whiteley at UFC Fight Night: Rockhold vs. Philippou on January 15, 2014. He won the fight by a unanimous decision.

Pichel faced Anthony Njokuani at UFC 173 on May 24, 2014. He won the fight via unanimous decision. In the months after the fight, Pichel suffered a torn labrum and bicep, sidelining him for three years.

After an extended hiatus, Pichel returned to face Damien Brown on June 11, 2017 at UFC Fight Night 110. He won the fight via knockout in the first round.

Pichel faced Joaquim Silva on January 27, 2018 at UFC on Fox: Jacaré vs. Brunson 2. He won the fight by unanimous decision.

Pichel faced Gregor Gillespie on June 1, 2018 at UFC Fight Night 131. He lost the fight via arm-triangle choke in the second round.

Pichel faced Roosevelt Roberts on June 29, 2019 at  UFC on ESPN 3. He won the fight via unanimous decision. The fight was the last of his prevailing contract with the UFC, making him a free agent.

Pichel was scheduled to face Alexander Yakovlev on November 9, 2019 at UFC on ESPN+ 21 However, Pichel pulled out of the fight on October 24 citing an undisclosed injury and was replaced by Roosevelt Roberts.

Having recovered from the hip surgery that pulled him from the Yakovlev fight, Pichel faced Jim Miller at UFC 252 on August 15, 2020. He won the fight by unanimous decision.

Pichel faced Austin Hubbard on August 21, 2021 at UFC on ESPN 29. He won the fight via unanimous decision.

Pichel was scheduled to face Mark Madsen on February 12, 2022 at UFC 271. However, they were pushed back to UFC 273 due to unknown reasons. He lost the fight via unanimous decision.

Pichel was scheduled to face Jesse Ronson on October 1, 2022 at UFC Fight Night 211. However, Pichel withdraw due to an undisclosed injury and was replaced by Joaquim Silva.

Personal life
Pichel formerly worked for AAA while also fighting in the UFC. Later, he went to school to become an electrician instead.

Mixed martial arts record

|-
|Loss
|align=center|14–3
|Mark Madsen
|Decision (unanimous)
|UFC 273
|
|align=center|3
|align=center|5:00
|Jacksonville, Florida, United States
|
|-
|Win
|align=center|14–2
|Austin Hubbard
|Decision (unanimous)
|UFC on ESPN: Cannonier vs. Gastelum 
|
|align=center|3
|align=center|5:00
|Las Vegas, Nevada, United States
|
|-
|Win
|align=center|13–2
|Jim Miller
|Decision (unanimous)
|UFC 252 
|
|align=center|3
|align=center|5:00
|Las Vegas, Nevada, United States
|
|-
|Win
|align=center|12–2
|Roosevelt Roberts
|Decision (unanimous)
|UFC on ESPN: Ngannou vs. dos Santos 
|
|align=center|3
|align=center|5:00
|Minneapolis, Minnesota, United States
|
|- 
|Loss
|align=center|11–2
|Gregor Gillespie
|Submission (arm-triangle choke)
|UFC Fight Night: Rivera vs. Moraes
|
|align=center|2
|align=center|4:06
|Utica, New York, United States
|
|-
|Win
|align=center|11–1
|Joaquim Silva
|Decision (unanimous)
|UFC on Fox: Jacaré vs. Brunson 2 
|
|align=center|3
|align=center|5:00
|Charlotte, North Carolina, United States
|
|-
|Win
|align=center|10–1
|Damien Brown
|KO (punches)
|UFC Fight Night: Lewis vs. Hunt
|
|align=center|1
|align=center|3:37
|Auckland, New Zealand
|
|-
|Win
|align=center|9–1
|Anthony Njokuani
|Decision (unanimous)
|UFC 173
|
|align=center| 3
|align=center| 5:00
|Las Vegas, Nevada, United States
|
|-
|Win
|align=center|8–1
|Garett Whiteley
|Decision (unanimous)
|UFC Fight Night: Rockhold vs. Philippou
|
|align=center| 3
|align=center| 5:00
|Duluth, Georgia, United States
|
|-
|Loss
|align=center|7–1
|Rustam Khabilov
|KO (suplex and punches)
|The Ultimate Fighter: Team Carwin vs. Team Nelson Finale
|
|align=center| 1
|align=center| 2:15
|Las Vegas, Nevada, United States
|
|-
|Win
|align=center|7–0
|David Gardner
|TKO (punches)
|Fight Club OC
|
|align=center| 2
|align=center| 1:47
|Costa Mesa, California, United States
|
|-
|Win
|align=center|6–0
|Matt Bahntge
|KO (punch)
|All Stars Promotions MMA
|
|align=center| 2
|align=center| 0:32
|Commerce, California, United States
|
|-
|Win
|align=center|5–0
|Emilio Chavez
|TKO (punches)
|Respect the Cage
|
|align=center| 2
|align=center| 2:52
|Pomona, California, United States
|
|-
|Win
|align=center|4–0
|Rodney Rhoden
|TKO (punches)
|All Star Promotions: Civic Disobedience 4
|
|align=center| 2
|align=center| 1:56
|Los Angeles, California, United States
|
|-
|Win
|align=center|3–0
|Anthony McDavitt
|TKO (punches)
|Santa Ynez MMA
|
|align=center| 2
|align=center| 0:23
|Santa Ynez, California, United States
|
|-
|Win
|align=center|2–0
|Miles Howard
|TKO (punches)
|National Fight Alliance MMA: Resurrection
|
|align=center| 2
|align=center| 1:05
|Ventura, California, United States
|
|-
|Win
|align=center|1–0
|Franky Childs
|KO (punches)
|Hitman Fighting Productions
|
|align=center| 1
|align=center| 2:15
|Pomona, California, United States
|
|}

|-
|Loss
|align=center|3–1
| Al Iaquinta
| Decision (unanimous)
| rowspan=4|The Ultimate Fighter: Live
| (Live airdate)
|align=center|2
|align=center|5:00
| rowspan=4|Las Vegas, Nevada, United States
|
|-
|Win
|align=center|3–0
| Chris Saunders 
| Decision (majority)
| (Live airdate)
|align=center|2
|align=center|5:00
|
|-
|Win
|align=center|2–0
| John Cofer
| Submission (arm triangle choke)
| (Live airdate)
|align=center|3
|align=center|0:44
|
|-
|Win
|align=center|1–0
| Cody Pfister
| Submission (rear naked choke)
| (Live airdate)
|align=center|1
|align=center|3:39
|

See also
 List of current UFC fighters
 List of male mixed martial artists

References

External links
 
 

1982 births
Living people
Lightweight mixed martial artists
Mixed martial artists utilizing Brazilian jiu-jitsu
American male mixed martial artists
Ultimate Fighting Championship male fighters
People from Lancaster, California
Mixed martial artists from California
American practitioners of Brazilian jiu-jitsu
People awarded a black belt in Brazilian jiu-jitsu